Listeria rocourtiae is a species of bacteria. It is a Gram-positive, facultatively anaerobic, motile, non-spore-forming bacillus. It is non-pathongenic and non-hemolytic. The species was first isolated from pre-cut lettuce in Salzburg, Austria in 2002. It is named in honor of Jocelyne Rocourt, "whose work had a major impact on the taxonomy of the genus Listeria."

References

Further reading

External links

LPSN
Type strain of Listeria rocourtiae at BacDive -  the Bacterial Diversity Metadatabase

rocourtiae
Bacteria described in 2002